Donald Carthew Oliver  (16 April 1937 – 26 February 1996) was a New Zealand weightlifter and fitness centre founder. He represented his country at three Olympic Games, and won two Commonwealth medals, including gold in 1966 in Kingston.

Early life and family
Born in the Auckland suburb of Avondale on 16 April 1937, Oliver was educated at Avondale College. On 18 March 1967, he married Maureen Baty, and the couple had three children.

Weightlifting
Oliver won the gold medal at the 1966 British Empire and Commonwealth Games in the men's heavyweight division. At the 1962 British Empire and Commonwealth Games he won the silver medal in the same division.

Oliver represented New Zealand at three Olympic Games in the heavyweight division. At the 1960 Summer Olympics, Oliver lifted a combined weight of 425 kg and finished in 13th place. Four years later in Tokyo at the 1964 Summer Olympics he lifted 480 kg and finished in ninth place. In his last Olympics, Oliver recorded his best finish lifting 490 kg and finishing in eighth place at the 1968 Summer Olympics in Mexico City, where he was also the New Zealand team flagbearer at the opening ceremony.

In all, Oliver won 10 New Zealand national weightlifting titles in the heavyweight division, and he was the New Zealand record holder in that division from 1959 to 1968.

At the 1974 Commonwealth Games in Christchurch, Oliver was the New Zealand weightlifting team coach.

Work and business
Oliver was a butcher by trade. From 1952 to 1973, he worked as a retail butcher, production boner, and plant safety and training officer. He tutored apprentice butchers at the Manukau Technical Institute between 1973 ad 1976.

In 1975, he opened his first gym, the Don Oliver Health Centre, and he went on to own six gyms in Auckland, and start his own brand of fitness equipment. He was a personal trainer to several All Blacks, including Michael Jones, Eroni Clarke, Va'aiga Tuigamala and Craig Dowd.

Other activities
Oliver served as chair of the Auckland Asthma Society, and was deacon of Glen Eden Baptist Church.

Honours
In the 1981 Queen's Birthday Honours, Oliver was appointed an Officer of the Order of the British Empire, for services to weightlifting and the community.

Death
Oliver died of cancer in Auckland on 26 February 1996, and he was buried at Waikumete Cemetery.

References

1937 births
1996 deaths
Sportspeople from Auckland
People educated at Avondale College
New Zealand male weightlifters
Olympic weightlifters of New Zealand
Weightlifters at the 1960 Summer Olympics
Weightlifters at the 1964 Summer Olympics
Weightlifters at the 1968 Summer Olympics
Commonwealth Games gold medallists for New Zealand
Commonwealth Games silver medallists for New Zealand
Weightlifters at the 1962 British Empire and Commonwealth Games
Weightlifters at the 1966 British Empire and Commonwealth Games
New Zealand Officers of the Order of the British Empire
Commonwealth Games medallists in weightlifting
New Zealand sports coaches
Deaths from cancer in New Zealand
Burials at Waikumete Cemetery
New Zealand businesspeople
Medallists at the 1962 British Empire and Commonwealth Games
Medallists at the 1966 British Empire and Commonwealth Games